Copelatus enganensis is a species of diving beetle. It is part of the genus Copelatus in the subfamily Copelatinae of the family Dytiscidae. It was described by Félix Guignot in 1940.

References

enganensis
Beetles described in 1940